is a train station in Urahoro, Tokachi District, Hokkaidō, Japan.

Lines
Hokkaido Railway Company
Nemuro Main Line Station K39

Adjacent stations

Railway stations in Hokkaido Prefecture
Railway stations in Japan opened in 1910